Lockyer Island is an island 2.5 mi long, lying off the south shore of James Ross Island in the SW entrance to Admiralty Sound in Antarctica. Named Cape Lockyer by Capt. James Clark Ross, Jan. 7, 1843, at the request of Capt. Francis R.M. Crozier in honor of the latter's friend, Capt. Nicholas Lockyer (1803–1843), Royal Navy. The insularity of the feature was determined by the Swedish Antarctic Expedition under Otto Nordenskiöld in 1902.

References

Islands of the James Ross Island group